Bazaiges is a commune in the Indre département in central France.

Geography
The river Abloux forms part of the commune's southwestern border.

Population

See also
Communes of the Indre department

References

Communes of Indre